The Naval Air Force Reserve (NAFR, also known by its head, the Commander, Naval Air Force Reserve, abbreviated CNAFR) is the naval aviation component of the United States Navy Reserve. Headquartered at Naval Air Station North Island, California, the organization has control over three aircraft wings, as well as the Navy Air Logistics Office, and Naval Air Facility Washington. The organization retains control over multiple unique assets, controlling the U.S. Navy's entire intra-theater airlift capability within Fleet Logistics Support Wing, as well as all Navy adversary training units, subordinate to the Tactical Support Wing.

Units
The following units are subordinate to the Naval Air Force Reserve :
 Fleet Logistics Support Wing (Naval Air Station Joint Reserve Base Fort Worth, Texas)
 VR-1 (Naval Air Facility Washington, Maryland)
 VR-51 (Marine Corps Air Station Kaneohe Bay, Hawaii)
 VR-53 (Naval Air Facility Washington, Maryland)
 VR-54 (Naval Air Station Joint Reserve Base New Orleans, Louisiana)
 VR-55 (Naval Air Station Point Mugu, California)
 VR-56 (Naval Air Station Oceana, Virginia)
 VR-57 (Naval Air Station North Island, California)
 VR-58 (Naval Air Station Jacksonville, Florida)
 VR-59 (Naval Air Station Joint Reserve Base Fort Worth, Texas)
 VR-61 (Naval Air Station Whidbey Island, Washington)
 VR-62 (Naval Air Station Jacksonville, Florida)
 VR-64 (Joint Base McGuire–Dix–Lakehurst, New Jersey
 Maritime Support Wing (Naval Air Station North Island, California)
 HSM-60 (Naval Air Station Jacksonville, Florida)
 VP-62 (Naval Air Station Jacksonville, Florida)
 VP-69 (Naval Air Station Whidbey Island, Washington)
 HSC-85 (Naval Air Station North Island, California)
 Tactical Support Wing (Naval Air Station Joint Reserve Base Fort Worth, Texas)
 VFC-12 (Naval Air Station Oceana, Virginia)
 VFC-13 (Naval Air Station Fallon, Nevada)
 VFC-111 (Naval Air Station Key West, Florida)
 VFC-204 (Naval Air Station Joint Reserve Base New Orleans, Louisiana)
 VAQ-209 (Naval Air Station Whidbey Island, Washington)

Gallery

References

Air units and formations of the United States Navy
Military units and formations in California
Military units and formations of the United States Navy Reserve